The January 1276 papal conclave (January 21–22), was the first papal election held under the rules of constitution Ubi periculum issued by Pope Gregory X in 1274, which established papal conclaves. According to Ubi periculum Cardinals were to be secluded in a closed area; they were not even accorded separate rooms. No cardinal was allowed to be attended by more than one servant unless ill. Food was to be supplied through a window; after three days of the meeting, the cardinals were to receive only one dish a day; after five days, they were to receive just bread and water. During the conclave, no cardinal was to receive any ecclesiastical revenue.  These provisions were regularly disregarded, at the discretion of the cardinals, particularly the requirement of being incommunicado.

Although several times before papal elections were held in the circumstances similar to those described by Ubi periculum, for the first time such situation was formally required by a papal Constitution. For this reason, the  Conclave of January 1276 can be considered the first papal conclave in history in the strictly legal sense of this word.

List of participants

Pope Gregory X died on January 10, 1276, at Arezzo. At the time of his death there were probably 15 cardinals in the Sacred College, but only 13 of them participated in the subsequent conclave. Seven of them were created by Urban IV, four by Gregory X and one by Gregory IX:

Absentee cardinals

Two cardinals were absent, including one created by Urban IV and one created by Innocent IV:

Conclave. Election of Pope Innocent V

On January 20, 10 days after the death of Gregory X, 15 cardinals assembled in the episcopal palace in Arezzo. In the first scrutiny on the following day they unanimously elected French Cardinal Pierre de Tarentaise, bishop of Ostia e Velletri, who took the name of Innocent V. He was the first Dominican pope.

Notes

External links
 
Vatican History: Konklave 1276 (Innozenz V)
The Conclave of January, 1276 (Prof. J. P. Adams)

Papal conclaves
13th-century elections
1276
13th-century Catholicism
1276 in Europe